Committee on Interior and Insular Affairs may refer to:
 United States House Committee on Interior and Insular Affairs (1951–1991)
 United States Senate Committee on Interior and Insular Affairs (1948–1977)